is a passenger railway station in located in the city of  Kyōtango, Kyoto Prefecture, Japan, operated by the private railway company Willer Trains (Kyoto Tango Railway).

Lines
Amino Station is a station of the Miyazu Line, and is located 55.5 kilometers from the terminus of the line at Nishi-Maizuru Station.

Station layout
The station consists of one ground-level side platform and one ground-level island platform connected by a footbridge. There is a ticket window in the station building, which features the motif of a yacht.

Platforms

Adjacent stations

History
The station opened on December 25, 1926.

Passenger statistics
In fiscal 2018, the station was used by an average of 200 passengers daily.

Surrounding area
 Kyotango City Amino Government Building

See also
List of railway stations in Japan

References

External links

Official home page 

Railway stations in Kyoto Prefecture
Railway stations in Japan opened in 1926
Kyōtango